Uriah Heep Live is a double live album by British rock group Uriah Heep, released in April 1973 in the US by Mercury Records, and in May 1973 in the UK by Bronze Records. It was the band's first live album. The album was recorded by the Pye Mobile Unit, with Alan Perkins as engineer.

In addition to a live version of the band's hit "Easy Livin'", the record included live cuts such as "Sweet Lorraine", "Sunrise" and an extended live version of "July Morning". While the band was on tour in the United States, the album reached No. 23 in the UK Albums Chart.

The original album packaging, as typical in early 1970s rock music, featured a gatefold sleeve and centre pages featuring photographs of the band members.

Uriah Heep Live was certified gold by the RIAA on 12 October 1973; it was the band's third US gold album.

Mercury initially re-released the album on CD in 1989 without the medley, due to time constraints. This was restored on all later editions, including the reissues in 1990 by Castle Communications; remastered and expanded 2003/2010 by Sanctuary Records.

Track listing

Roll over Beethoven (Chuck Berry)
Blue Suede Shoes (Carl Perkins)
Mean Woman Blues (Claude Demetrius)
Hound Dog  (Jerry Leiber and Mike Stoller)
At the Hop (Artie Singer, John Medora, David White)
Whole Lotta Shakin' Goin' On (Dave Williams)

Personnel
Uriah Heep
 David Byron – vocals
 Mick Box – guitar, backing vocals
 Ken Hensley – keyboards, guitar, backing vocals
 Lee Kerslake – drums, backing vocals
 Gary Thain – bass guitar, backing vocals

Additional personnel
 Thomas "Todd" Fischer – stage announcer

Production
 Gerry Bron – producer
 Peter Gallen – producer assistant, mixing at Lansdowne Studios, London
 Ashley Howe – mixing
 Alan Perkins, Neville Crozier, Richard Brand – live recording engineers
 Gilbert Kong – mastering
 Mike Brown and Robert Corich – remastering (1996 and 2003 reissues)
 Andy Pearce – remastering (2010 reissue)

Charts

Certifications

References

External links
 The Official Uriah Heep Discography

1973 live albums
Uriah Heep (band) live albums
Albums produced by Gerry Bron
Bronze Records live albums
Mercury Records live albums